Stephen P. LedDuc  is a former American state legislator who served in the Massachusetts House of Representatives from 1997 to 2009.

References

Living people
Democratic Party members of the Massachusetts House of Representatives
Framingham State University alumni
1968 births